Canoeing at the 2013 Canada Summer Games was in Sherbrooke, Quebec at Lac des Nations.  It was held from the 13 to 17 August.  There were 21 events of canoeing and kayaking.

Medal table
The following is the medal table for sprint canoeing at the 2013 Canada Summer Games.

Men's

Canoeing

Kayaking

Women's

Canoeing

Kayaking

References

External links 

2013 Canada Summer Games
2013 in canoeing
2013 Canada Games